Mihail Moraru (born 22 October 1979) is a Moldovan former professional footballer who played as a goalkeeper. Moraru played in Moldova for: Dacia Chişinău, Milsami Orhei, Costuleni and Rapid Ghidighici and in Romania for: Petrolul Ploieşti and Arieşul Turda.

International career
Mihail Moraru played an international game for Moldova, in a 1–1 draw against Macedonia.

Honours 
Milsami Orhei
 Moldovan Cup: 2011–12

External links 
 
 

1979 births
Living people
Footballers from Chișinău
Moldovan footballers
Association football goalkeepers
Moldova international footballers
Moldovan Super Liga players
FC Dacia Chișinău players
FC Milsami Orhei players
FC Costuleni players
FC Rapid Ghidighici players
Liga II players
FC Petrolul Ploiești players
ACS Sticla Arieșul Turda players
Moldovan expatriate footballers
Moldovan expatriate sportspeople in Romania
Expatriate footballers in Romania